Artspace, officially Artspace Visual Arts Centre, formerly stylised ARTSPACE Visual Arts Centre, is a leading international residency-based contemporary art centre, housed in the historic Gunnery Building in Woolloomooloo, fronting Sydney Harbour in Sydney, Australia. Devoted to the development of certain new ideas and practices in contemporary art and culture, since the early 1980s Artspace has been building a critical context for Australian and international artists, curators and writers.

Each year, Artspace presents between 24 and 30 gallery projects, hosts over 50 artist residencies, initiates a range of public program and education activities, and publishes a regular projects journal together with cultural theory books and artist monographs.

Artspace is supported by the Visual Arts and Crafts Strategy, an initiative of the Australian, State and Territory Governments. It is also assisted by the Government of New South Wales through Create NSW and by the Australia Council, the Australian Government's arts funding and advisory body.

Artspace is a member of the advocacy organisation Contemporary Art Organisations Australia.

Alexie Glass-Kantor was Executive Director in 2014, when she was invited as guest judge for the churchie national emerging art prize in Brisbane.
 she still holds this position.

See also
 Culture of Sydney

References

External links 
 

Arts centres in Australia
Contemporary art galleries in Australia
Art museums and galleries in Sydney